Platyptilia enargota is a moth of the family Pterophoridae. It is known from Borneo and New Guinea.

References

External links
Papua Insects

enargota
Moths described in 1915